Kavar Lavan (also Romanized as Kāvar Lavān; also known as Kāvareh Lavān, Kāverlāvānd, and Kāwralawān) is a village in Dorudfaraman Rural District, in the Central District of Kermanshah County, Kermanshah Province, Iran. At the 2006 census, its population was 341, in 71 families.

References 

Populated places in Kermanshah County